Infidel is an unbeliever.

Infidel or Infidels may also refer to:

in a context of Islam, a translation of kafir

Film, TV, books and games
The Infidel (1922 film), a 1922 film featuring Boris Karloff
The Infidel (2010 film), a 2010 film
Infidel (film), a 2020 film starring Jim Caviezel
Infidel (video game), a 1983 Infocom text adventure
Infidel: My Life, a 2007 book by Ayaan Hirsi Ali
Infidel (novel), a novel by Ted Dekker

Music
Infidels (band), a Canadian funk-rock band from the 1990s
Infidels (Bob Dylan album), a 1983 album by Bob Dylan
The Infidel (album), a 1991 album by the band Doubting Thomas
Infidel, a song by Muslimgauze

See also
Fidel Castro, Communist leader of Cuba who is sometimes incorrectly called Infidel Castro
Internet Infidels, a nonprofit educational organization
The Infidel Guy, an atheist radio talk show host
Infidelity
Irreligion